Costelloe Lodge is an early 20th century building in Casla, County Galway, Ireland. It was designed by Edwin Lutyens for J. Bruce Ismay, chairman of the  White Star Line, after Ismay's original fishing lodge was burnt out in an IRA attack in 1922. Ismay had bought the house a year after the Titanic disaster and, largely ostracised by society, spent much time at the lodge until his death in 1937. After the attack on the house Ismay engaged Lutyens to undertake a major reconstruction. The garden was laid out by Lutyens’ long-time collaborator Gertrude Jekyll. Little documented and unreferenced in the major studies of Lutyens, the lodge remains privately owned and is a protected structure.

History and architecture
J. Bruce Ismay succeeded to the chairmanship of the White Star Shipping Line in 1899, on the death of his father. In 1912 he joined the RMS Titanic on its maiden voyage across the Atlantic. The ship struck an iceberg and sank, with the loss of 1,514 passengers and crew. Ismay took a place in the last lifeboat to leave the ship, an act that led to severe public criticism. Ismay was largely ostracised from society after his rescue from the Titanic, and spent much of his time at Costelloe until his death in 1937. He had bought the original fishing lodge at Casla in 1913 and, a keen angler himself, visited frequently. In 1922 the lodge was burnt out in an arson attack by the IRA and Ismay commissioned Lutyens to rebuild it.

Lutyens had established himself as one of England's leading architects of country houses. In his study of English domestic buildings, Das englische Haus, published in 1904, Hermann Muthesius had written of him, "He is a young man who has come increasingly to the forefront of domestic architects and who may soon become the accepted leader among English builders of houses". Muthesius’ prediction was fulfilled; over the course of the next twenty years Lutyens became preeminent as a designer of country houses, began the construction of New Delhi and became the foremost architect of memorials to the British dead of the First World War.

The rebuilding of Costelloe was completed by 1925 and the house is designed in Lutyens’ trademark Arts and Crafts style. The plan is long and irregular, with a total of nine bays under sweeping slate roofs. The construction material is rendered limestone rubble. The house is little documented and is not referenced in the major studies of Lutyens and his work. The lodge is a protected structure and remains privately owned.

Notes

References

Sources
 
 
 

Buildings and structures in County Galway
Works of Edwin Lutyens in Ireland
Arts and Crafts architecture